The Greatest Hits is a greatest hits album by Christian pop rock band Newsboys. The album features their biggest hit radio singles and two new songs entitled "I Fought the La..." and "Stay Strong". It also includes for the first time on a Newsboys album the song "In the Belly of the Whale", which was recorded for the Jonah: A VeggieTales Movie soundtrack.

Track listing

Singles 
Due to the Newsboys' previous studio album Go still being promoted by its own radio singles–"In Wonder" was still climbing the Christian charts at the time of the release of The Greatest Hits–the first single from the new compilation album, "Stay Strong" wasn't released as a radio single until early in 2008, nearly five months after the album's release. The single peaked at No. 19 on Billboard'''s Hot Christian Songs and No. 20 on the Hot Christian AC chart. "I Fought the La...", the other new recording from The Greatest Hits,'' was not released as a radio single.

References 

2007 greatest hits albums
Newsboys compilation albums